Fabrella is a genus of fungi in the family Hemiphacidiaceae. This is a monotypic genus, containing the single species Fabrella tsugae.

References

External links
Fabrella at Index Fungorum

Helotiales
Monotypic Ascomycota genera